Vanasthali is a census town in Tonk district in the Indian state of Rajasthan.

Demographics
 India census, Vanasthali had a population of 6,676. Males constitute 31% of the population and females 69%. Vanasthali has an average literacy rate of 82%, higher than the national average of 59.5%: male literacy is 77%, and female literacy is 84%. In Vanasthali, 9% of the population is under 6 years of age.

See also 
Banasthali Vidyapith

References

Cities and towns in Tonk district